A hydrogen valve is a special type of valve that is used for hydrogen at very low temperatures or high pressures in  hydrogen storage or for example hydrogen vehicles.

Types
High pressure ball valves up to 6000 psig (413 bar) at 250 degrees F (121 degrees C) and flow coefficients from 4.0 to 13.8.

Material
Valves used in industrial hydrogen and oxygen applications, such as petrochemical processes, are often made of inconel.

See also
 Diaphragm valve
 Gate valve
 Hydrogen tank

References

External links
Hydrogen valve

Valves
Hydrogen technologies
Cryogenics